The 2016–17 Temple Owls basketball team represented Temple University during the 2016–17 NCAA Division I men's basketball season. The Owls, led by 11th-year head coach Fran Dunphy, played their home games at the Liacouras Center in Philadelphia, Pennsylvania as members the American Athletic Conference. They finished the season 16–16, 7–11 in AAC play to finish in eighth place. They lost in the first round of the AAC tournament to East Carolina.

Previous season 
The Owls finished the 2015–16 season with a record 21–12, 14–4 in AAC play to win the regular season championship. They defeated South Florida in the first round of the AAC tournament to advance to the semifinals where they lost to UConn. They received an at-large bid as a No. 10 seed to the NCAA tournament where they lost in overtime in the First Round to Iowa by a buzzer beater from Adam Woodbury.

Departures

Incoming recruits

Roster

Schedule and results

|-
!colspan=12 style=| Non-conference regular season

|-
!colspan=6 style=| AAC regular season

|-
!colspan=12 style=|AAC Tournament

References

Temple Owls men's basketball seasons
Temple
Temple
Temple